Georgi Georgiev (born 8 September 1948) is a retired Bulgarian football striker.

References

1948 births
Living people
Bulgarian footballers
PFC Chernomorets Burgas players
PFC Slavia Sofia players
Bulgaria international footballers
Association football forwards